Friedel oscillations, named after French physicist Jacques Friedel, arise from localized perturbations in a metallic or semiconductor system caused by a defect in the Fermi gas or Fermi liquid. Friedel oscillations are a quantum mechanical analog to electric charge screening of charged species in a pool of ions. Whereas electrical charge screening utilizes a point entity treatment to describe the make-up of the ion pool, Friedel oscillations describing fermions in a Fermi fluid or Fermi gas require a quasi-particle or a scattering treatment. Such oscillations depict a characteristic exponential decay in the fermionic density near the perturbation followed by an ongoing sinusoidal decay resembling sinc function. In 2020, magnetic Friedel oscillations were observed on a metal surface.

One-dimensional electron gas 

As a simple model, consider one-dimensional electron gas in a half-space . The oscillating wave functions that satisfy this condition are 

 ,

We consider degenerate electron gas, so that the electrons fill states with energies less than the Fermi energy . Then, the electron density  is calculated as

,

where summation is taken over all wave vectors less than the Fermi wave vector , the factor 2 accounts for the spin degeneracy. By transforming the sum over  into the integral we obtain

.

We see that the boundary perturbs the electron density leading to its spatial oscillations with the period  near the boundary. At  the electron density equals to the unperturbed density of the one-dimensional electron gas .

Scattering description

The electrons that move through a metal or semiconductor behave like free electrons of a Fermi gas with a plane wave-like wave function, that is

.

Electrons in a metal behave differently than particles in a normal gas because electrons are fermions and they obey Fermi–Dirac statistics. This behaviour means that every k-state in the gas can only be occupied by two electrons with opposite spin. The occupied states fill a sphere in the band structure k-space, up to a fixed energy level, the so-called Fermi energy. The radius of the sphere in k-space, kF, is called the Fermi wave vector.

If there is a foreign atom embedded in the metal or semiconductor, a so-called impurity, the electrons that move freely through the solid are scattered by the deviating potential of the impurity. During the scattering process the initial state wave vector ki of the electron wave function is scattered to a final state wave vector kf. Because the electron gas is a Fermi gas only electrons with energies near the Fermi level can participate in the scattering process because there must be empty final states for the scattered states to jump to. Electrons that are too far below the Fermi energy EF can't jump to unoccupied states. The states around the Fermi level that can be scattered occupy a limited range of k-values or wavelengths. So only electrons within a limited wavelength range near the Fermi energy are scattered resulting in a density modulation around the impurity of the form

.

Qualitative description

In the classic scenario of electric charge screening, a dampening in the electric field is observed in a mobile charge-carrying fluid upon the presence of a charged object. Since electric charge screening considers the mobile charges in the fluid as point entities, the concentration of these charges with respect to distance away from the point decreases exponentially. This phenomenon is governed by Poisson–Boltzmann equation. The quantum mechanical description of a perturbation in a one-dimensional Fermi fluid is modelled by the Tomonaga-Luttinger liquid. The fermions in the fluid that take part in the screening cannot be considered as a point entity but a wave-vector is required to describe them. Charge density away from the perturbation is not a continuum but fermions arrange themselves at discrete spaces away from the perturbation. This effect is the cause of the circular ripples around the impurity.

N.B. Where classically near the charged perturbation an overwhelming number of oppositely charged particles can be observed, in the quantum mechanical scenario of Friedel oscillations periodic arrangements of oppositely charged fermions followed by spaces with same charged regions.
 
In the figure to the right, a 2-dimensional Friedel oscillations has been illustrated with an STM image of a clean  surface.  As the image is taken on a surface, the regions of low electron density leave the atomic nuclei ‘exposed’ which result in a net positive charge.

See also
Lindhard theory

References

External links
 http://gravityandlevity.wordpress.com/2009/06/02/friedel-oscillations-wherein-we-learn-that-the-electron-has-a-size/ - a simple explanation of the phenomenon

Condensed matter physics